Lena Maria Mellin (born 27 November 1954) is a Swedish journalist and domestic policy commentator for Aftonbladet. She has earlier been the news director at the same paper. Mellin was awarded Publicistklubben The Great Journalist Award in 1996. Two years later in 1998 she was awarded the Lukas Bonnier Great Journalist Award.
Mellin is also a recurring domestic policy commentator and writer for other media, amongst others in the book  Makten framför allt, an anthology about Göran Persson.

References

External links

Lena Mellin at Aftonbladet 

1954 births
Swedish women writers
Swedish journalists
Living people